is a professional Japanese baseball player. He plays pitcher for the Hiroshima Toyo Carp.

References 

1999 births
Living people
Baseball people from Saitama Prefecture
Japanese baseball players
Nippon Professional Baseball pitchers
Hiroshima Toyo Carp players
People from Kawaguchi, Saitama